Sancler Frantz Konzen (April 9, 1991) is a Brazilian model, journalist and beauty queen who won Miss Brazil World 2013 and represented Brazil at Miss World 2013 and placed in the Top 6. In 2023, she was appointed to represent Brazil at Miss Supranational 2023.

Biography
She was born in Arroio do Tigre, Rio Grande do Sul and was taken to Rio de Janeiro by the agent Sergio Mattos, through which participated in fashion weeks Fashion São Luís, Maranhão, and Fashion Days in Minas Gerais, where she modeled for brands like Colcci Fashion and Space. Also, made a parade of designer jewelry for Priscilla Szafir.

She also won numerous beauty contests, some of them: Princess Girl Summer 2009, Fall of Miss Rio Grande do Sul 2009; Miss Arroyo del Tigre 2010, Miss Rio Grande do Sul 2010 (step local); finalist of Miss Rio Grande do Sul 2010, the EC Musa Avenue 2010; Queen of Industry and Commerce of Rio Grande do Sul 2010; Princess Queen of Industry and Commerce of Rio Grande do Sul; Musa Gauchão 2010; Girl Jacuí Regional; Musa Sun RS; Musa Regional Clubs, More beautiful student of Rio Grande do Sul, in addition to local bands, such as Queen City of Arroio do Tigre.

Moreover, represented Brazil in the Miss Atlantic International 2011 in Punta del Este, Uruguay. The contest had representatives from Mexico, Bolivia, Uruguay, Panama, Andorra, Ecuador, Guatemala, Dominican Republic, Paraguay, Costa Rica, Spain, Argentina, South Africa, Colombia and Peru. Its goal is to promote the exchange of cultures and tourism in Latin America. In the first event of the competition, Miss Atlantic Brazil, Sancler Frantz received a range Etre Belle International Ambassador 2011, whose sponsor was a German company that funded the event. In addition, she led the popular vote by Internet, thus winning the title of Miss Atlantic International Internet.

Sancler is a journalism student from UNISC. She was host of the Journal of Pampa, Pampa TV news of Rio Grande do Sul, and also the Pampa Noon, besides participating in the variety show Studio Pampa. It brokered by the TEN model management agency in São Paulo.

Top Model - The Reality
She recently stayed in the reality show Top Model - the Reality, achieving 3rd place. Chosen candidates from Porto Alegre, Sancler competed against 23 other candidates selected in six capitals and went through a grueling routine that included learning how to apply makeup and parading professionally paint the glass to books of modeling agencies and participate in a tree climbing circuit, biking and kayaking to shoot. Always won praise from the judges and was the favorite of the public, winning the popular vote with 80% of the votes. She was also invited as a reporter for the Evening Program at TV Record.

Miss Brazil World 

In April 2013, she competed in the Miss Brazil World 2013 as Miss World Lobos Island. The representatives of 27 states and several Brazilian islands, totaling 37 candidates, arrived in Rio de Janeiro on March 31 and went to the Portobello Resort & Safari in Mangalore, where they participated in events and competitions characteristic of the contest. The elected Miss World Brazil 2013 would receive the crown of Mariana Notarangelo, Miss Brazil World 2012 and will represent the country in Miss World 2013 to be held in Jakarta, Indonesia, on Sept. 28, with more than 120 participating countries, characterized as the largest beauty pageant in the world.

To participate in this contest, Sancler had to develop a social project, which nominou of Hug Toasty through her were collected thousands of pieces of clothing for donation in her hometown of Arroio do Tigre (RS). The video of the development of this project can be seen on the official website of the contest and also on YouTube. Sancler obtained as a result the title of 2nd Best Social Project of all candidates. .

Before the final, that would be forwarded by UOL, Sancler earned a Best Smile. Furthermore, won the event called Parade of Top Model, was voted the 3rd Best Body contest and won the title of Miss Islands. In the end, Sancler was crowned the winner of the contest and won the right to represent Brazil in the Miss World contest, which occurs on September 28 of that year. "I'm not believing yet. It's A big dream I have. I gave the best of me. My differential is my determination to do my best and give my best in every race," said the winner in an interview with UOL. .

Miss World 2013 
Frantz represented Brazil at the Miss World 2013 pageant on September 28, 2013 held at the Bali Nusa Dua Convention Center in Bali, Indonesia. She placed in the Top 6 and was named the continental queen of beauty for the Americas.

Miss Supranational 2023
Frantz was appointed to represent Brazil at the Miss Supranational 2023.

References

(Most in Portuguese)

External links
Fan Club
Miss World

Brazilian female models
1991 births
Living people
Miss World 2013 delegates